Şahinler is a village in Gülşehir district of Nevşehir Province, Turkey. Access roads to the village are stabilized asphalt. There is a health center in the village, and a school for bussed education. In addition to water and sewerage networks, there are also electricity and telephone lines.

Population

References 

Villages in Gülşehir District